Handball at the 2017 Summer Deaflympics in Samsun took place at Çarşamba Sports Hall from 20th to 28th July 2017.

Men's competition

Group stage

Pool A

Pool B

Knockout stage

Classification

Medal summary

Medalists

References

External links
 Handball

2017 Summer Deaflympics
2017 in handball